Didymopanax is a genus of flowering plants in the family Araliaceae, native to southern Mexico, Central America, the Caribbean, and South America. It was resurrected from Schefflera in 2020.

Species
The following species are accepted:

Didymopanax acuminatus 
Didymopanax angustissimus 
Didymopanax auratus 
Didymopanax botumirimensis 
Didymopanax burchellii 
Didymopanax calvus 
Didymopanax capixabus 
Didymopanax cephalanthus 
Didymopanax ciliatifolius 
Didymopanax confusus 
Didymopanax cordatus 
Didymopanax decaphyllus 
Didymopanax dichotomus 
Didymopanax distractiflorus 
Didymopanax fruticosus 
Didymopanax gardneri 
Didymopanax glaziovii 
Didymopanax grandigemmus 
Didymopanax kollmannii 
Didymopanax longe-petiolatus 
Didymopanax lucumoides 
Didymopanax macrocarpus 
Didymopanax malmei 
Didymopanax morototoni 
Didymopanax pimichinensis 
Didymopanax plurifolius 
Didymopanax plurispicatus 
Didymopanax prancei 
Didymopanax pubicarpus 
Didymopanax quinquecarinatus 
Didymopanax racemifer 
Didymopanax ruschianus 
Didymopanax selloi 
Didymopanax tamatamaensis 
Didymopanax umbrosus 
Didymopanax villosissimus 
Didymopanax vinosus

References

 
Araliaceae
Apiales genera